Maurvangen is a campground by Øvre Sjodalsvatnet and a short distance from Gjendesheim. There are 26 cabins as well as camping spots for tents and caravans. A service building contains toilets, shower rooms, sauna, and a washing machine. It is located about 1,000 meters above sea level and lies next to the river Sjoa which is a popular fishing area.

Maurvangen has a small shop that sells food, hunting and fishing licenses, and a small restaurant that serves local homemade food. Maurvangen is owned and operated by the family Moen who are originally from Vågå.

External links
Maurvangen web site

Campsites in Norway
Vågå
Jotunheimen